Afon Llynfi may refer to:
Afon Llynfi (Wye), the tributary of the River Wye at Llangors
River Llynfi, the tributary of the Ogmore River near Maesteg